The 2015–16 season was Ipswich Town's 14th consecutive season in the second tier of English football and 138th year in existence. Along with competing in the Championship, the club also participated in the FA Cup and League Cup. The season covered the period from 1 July 2015 to 30 June 2016.

This was to be Mick McCarthy's third full season as manager, having taken charge in November 2012. In January both McCarthy and his assistant Terry Connor extended their contracts with the club until the summer of 2018.

Kits
Supplier: Adidas / Sponsor: Marcus Evans Group

First-team squad

Left club during season

First-team coaching staff

Pre-season
On 27 May 2015, Ipswich Town announced they will travel to Ireland to face Shelbourne on 11 July 2015. A second friendly was announced a day later when the club confirmed they will travel to face Cambridge United. Also confirmed on 28 May 2015 was friendlies against Fortuna Düsseldorf and Colchester United. On 29 May 2015, Ipswich Town announced a friendly against Peterborough United. On 9 July 2015, Ipswich announced a home friendly against Dutch side Utrecht. On 23 July 2015, Ipswich announced a XI side will travel to face Bishop's Stortford; the match was subsequently postponed following torrential rain.

Competitions

Football League Championship

League table

Results summary

Results by round

Matches
On 17 June 2015, the fixtures for the forthcoming season were announced.

FA Cup

League Cup

On 16 June 2015, the first round draw was made, Ipswich Town were drawn at home against Stevenage. Ipswich Town were drawn away to Doncaster Rovers in the second round. The third round draw was made on 25 August 2015 live on Sky Sports by Charlie Nicholas and Phil Thompson. Ipswich Town were drawn away to Manchester United.

Transfers

Transfers in

Loans in

Transfers out

Loans out

Squad statistics
All statistics updated as of end of season

Appearances and goals

|-
! colspan=14 style=background:#dcdcdc; text-align:center| Goalkeepers

|-
! colspan=14 style=background:#dcdcdc; text-align:center| Defenders

|-
! colspan=14 style=background:#dcdcdc; text-align:center| Midfielders

}

|-
! colspan=14 style=background:#dcdcdc; text-align:center| Forwards

|-
! colspan=14 style=background:#dcdcdc; text-align:center| Players transferred out during the season

|-

Goalscorers

Assists

Clean sheets

Disciplinary record

Starting 11
Considering starts in all competitions

Awards

Player awards

Football League Championship Manager of the Month

Football League Championship Player of the Month

References

Ipswich Town
Ipswich Town F.C. seasons